Malacoctenus erdmani is a species of labrisomid blenny native to the western Atlantic Ocean and the Caribbean Sea from the Bahamas to Curaçao.  This species is an inhabitant of reefs where it prefers areas that provide hiding places such as coral rubble and rock and patches of algae.  It can reach a length of  TL. The specific name honours the fishery biologist Donald S. Erdman.

References

erdmani
Fish of the Caribbean
Fish described in 1957